The Texas Heartbeat Act, Senate Bill 8 (SB 8), is an act of the Texas Legislature that bans abortion after the detection of embryonic or fetal cardiac activity, which normally occurs after about six weeks of pregnancy. The law took effect on September 1, 2021, after the U.S. Supreme Court denied a request for emergency relief from Texas abortion providers. It is the first time a state has successfully imposed a six-week abortion ban since Roe v. Wade, and the first abortion restriction to rely solely on enforcement by private individuals through civil lawsuits, rather than having state officials enforce the law with criminal or civil penalties. The act authorizes members of the public to sue anyone who performs or facilitates an illegal abortion for a minimum of $10,000 in statutory damages per abortion, plus court costs and attorneys' fees.

The Texas Heartbeat Act has been subjected to numerous lawsuits in state and federal court, but the statute has thus far withstood each of these court challenges and remains in effect. Lawsuits challenging the constitutionality of the Act have been filed by abortion providers and advocates, as well as the United States Department of Justice, but none of these lawsuits have been able to restore access to post-heartbeat abortions in Texas. The law has been exceedingly difficult to challenge in court because of its unique enforcement mechanism, which bars state officials from enforcing the law and instead authorizes private individuals to sue anyone who performs or assists a post-heartbeat abortion. Because the law is enforced by private citizens rather than government officials, abortion providers have been unable to obtain relief that will stop private lawsuits from being initiated against them. This produced an end-run around Roe v. Wade, which had established a federal constitutional right to abortion, because the threat of private civil-enforcement lawsuits forced abortion providers to comply with SB 8 despite its incompatibility with the Supreme Court's then-existing abortion pronouncements.

Even when courts have declared SB 8 unconstitutional, abortion providers have remained in compliance with the Act because it purports to subject individuals to private civil-enforcement lawsuits if they perform or assist a post-heartbeat abortion while an injunction that blocks the law's enforcement is in effect, if that injunction is later vacated or reversed on appeal. On October 6, 2021, federal district Judge Robert L. Pitman issued a preliminary injunction that blocked the state of Texas from enforcing the law, which remained in effect until the U.S. Court of Appeals for the Fifth Circuit issued a stay of Pitman's order two days later. Yet Pitman's order was unable to fully restore access to post-heartbeat abortions in Texas, even during the 48-hour window in which it was in effect, because abortion providers were unwilling to risk the civil liability that would be imposed if Pitman's injunction were stayed or overturned by a higher court. The U.S. Supreme Court declined to overturn the Fifth Circuit's stay of Pitman's ruling, so any post-heartbeat abortions performed in reliance on Pitman's injunction are subject to private civil-enforcement lawsuits under the terms of SB 8. This has made it difficult for abortion providers to resume services even when they obtain relief from a lower court that pronounces the statute unconstitutional, and it has further frustrated efforts to thwart the statute's enforcement in court.

The success of the Texas Heartbeat Act was a major blow to Roe v. Wade, as it provided a blueprint for states to outlaw abortion while insulating their laws from effective judicial review. This enabled the states to evade Roe v. Wade and other Supreme Court rulings that had declared abortion to be a constitutionally protected right. It also led other states to copy SB 8's enforcement mechanism and immunize their restrictive abortion laws from judicial review. On May 25, 2022, Oklahoma Governor Kevin Stitt signed HB 4327 into law, which outlaws abortion from the moment of fertilization. Because HB 4237, like the Texas Heartbeat Act, is enforced solely through civil lawsuits brought by private citizens, abortion providers were unable to stop the law in court and ceased performing abortions in Oklahoma, even though the Supreme Court had not yet overruled Roe v. Wade when the statute took effect. Idaho has also enacted a six-week abortion ban modeled after the Texas Heartbeat Act, which has prevented abortion providers from challenging the constitutionality of the statute in federal court.

Background 

 A different six-week abortion ban, HB 59, was previously introduced in Texas by Representative Phil King on July 18, 2013. The bill did not pass. In 2019, another six-week abortion ban was introduced as HB 1500, which was jointly authored by Representatives Briscoe Cain, Phil King, Dan Flynn, Tan Parker, and Rick Miller. As of February 26, 2019, HB 1500 had 57 sponsors or cosponsors of the 150 members of the Texas House of Representatives. HB 1500, like HB 59, relied on conventional public enforcement by state officials, similar to laws that had been enacted in other states. HB 1500 did not pass.

On March 11, 2021, the Texas Heartbeat Bill (Senate Bill 8 or SB 8 for short) was introduced by Senator Bryan Hughes. A companion bill (HB 1515) was filed by Representative Shelby Slawson a day later in the Texas House of Representatives. Unlike HB 1500, SB 8 and HB 1515 contained a novel enforcement mechanism designed to shield the law from pre-enforcement judicial review. Each of the bills explicitly forbade state officials to enforce the law in any way, and instead authorized private individuals to sue those who perform or assist abortions after cardiac activity had been detected for $10,000 per abortion, plus costs and attorneys' fees. In structuring the law this way, the authors sought to shield it from judicial review in federal court, because lawsuits challenging the constitutionality of a state statute must be brought against state officials charged with enforcing the disputed law, rather than against the state itself. And without a state official who enforces the law, there is no one for abortion providers to sue pre-enforcement; they must instead wait to be sued in state court by a private individual and assert their constitutional claims as a defense to liability in those private civil-enforcement proceedings. This enforcement mechanism is very similar to private attorney general laws. Hughes revealed that he had modeled SB8 after private attorney general laws like the Texas Medicaid Fraud Prevention Act which also offered bounties for successful lawsuits.

The private civil-enforcement feature of the law was engineered by former Stanford law professor Jonathan F. Mitchell. The idea was based on his 2018 Virginia Law Review article, "The Writ-of-Erasure Fallacy", which noted that laws enforced solely by private citizens are nearly impossible to challenge in pre-enforcement lawsuits. He later brought this idea to the attention of Mark Lee Dickson, an East Texas anti-abortion pastor, in 2019. Dickson was able to persuade the city council of Waskom, Texas, to enact an ordinance that outlawed abortion within city limits through the private civil-enforcement mechanism proposed by Mitchell, although it was mostly a symbolic move as the town had no abortion providers. Dickson then championed for similar laws to be passed in other towns and cities in Texas over the following years, including Lubbock, where a Planned Parenthood facility halted abortion procedures following passage of the local law. Mitchell helped Hughes draft the bill for the state based on the municipal ordinances he had written as a means of avoiding pre-enforcement judicial scrutiny, primarily by taking state officials out of enforcing the abortion ban and leaving enforcement entirely in the hands of private individuals.

The bill was a legislative priority of Republican lawmakers for the 2021 regular session, denoted 87(R). The Senate version was approved by both houses of the bicameral Texas legislature after the Senate concurred with House amendments. Texas governor Greg Abbott signed the bill on May 19, 2021, and it took effect on September 1, 2021.

Provisions 

The Texas Heartbeat Act contains twelve sections. Although the Act is best known for its provisions that outlaw abortion after cardiac activity has been detected, and that authorize private lawsuits against those who violate the Act, the Act includes other provisions that further restrict abortion and deter litigants from challenging abortion laws in court. It is regarded as one of the most aggressive and far-reaching pieces of anti-abortion legislation that has ever been enacted.

Section 2 

Section 2 of the Act declares that Texas has never repealed, either expressly or by implication, its pre–Roe v. Wade statutes that outlaw and criminalize abortion unless the mother's life is in danger. The Texas pre-Roe abortion laws are still codified at articles 4512.1 through 4512.6 of the Revised Civil Statutes, and they impose felony criminal liability on anyone who performs an elective abortion, as well as anyone who "furnishes the means for procuring an abortion knowing the purpose intended". The punishment is two to five years' imprisonment for each abortion performed or facilitated, and the statute of limitations is three years.

By declaring that the state's pre-Roe criminal abortion have never been repealed, section 2 overrules McCorvey v. Hill, a 2004 decision from the U.S. Court of Appeals for the Fifth Circuit, which held that Texas had implicitly repealed its pre-Roe criminal abortion statutes by enacting subsequent legislation that regulates the abortion procedure. It also ensures that all abortions performed in Texas—including abortions that occur before cardiac activity is detectable—are defined and regarded as criminal acts under Texas law, even though prosecutors in Texas cannot indict or charge abortion providers for their violations of these statutes until Roe v. Wade is overruled.

The enactment of section 2 has led Texas officials to threaten abortion funds and their donors with criminal prosecution under the state's pre-Roe abortion statutes. On March 18, 2022, Representative Briscoe Cain sent cease-and-desist letters to every abortion fund in Texas, demanding that they immediately stop paying for elective abortions performed in Texas. Cain warned that these abortion funds were violating the state's unrepealed pre-Roe abortion statutes by “furnishing the means for procuring an abortion knowing the purpose intended,” and that every single one their employees, volunteers, and donors could face criminal prosecution for violating the state's pre-Roe laws. Cain pointed out that neither Roe v. Wade nor any other decision of the Supreme Court has ever created or recognized a constitutional right to pay for another person's abortion, and that Roe protects only abortion providers and their patients from prosecution under the state's pre-Roe criminal abortion prohibitions. Abortion funds in Texas have refused to halt their activities in response to Cain's letter, and Cain has promised to introduce legislation that will ensure that Texas abortion funds and their donors are prosecuted for each abortion that they have assisted in violation of the state's pre-Roe abortion laws.

Section 3 

Section 3 of the Act requires a physician to test for a “fetal heartbeat” (or “cardiac activity”)  before performing an abortion and prohibits abortion if a “fetal heartbeat” is detected. The only exception is for when “a physician believes a medical emergency exists that prevents compliance.” The term "medical emergency" is not defined in the statute.

Section 3 includes a provision that specifically bans public enforcement of the law by state or local officials, and insists that the sole means of enforcement shall take place through civil-enforcement lawsuits brought by private individuals.

Section 3 also authorizes any private individual to sue anyone who performs or induces, or "aids and abets," a post-heartbeat abortion. Although an abortion patient may not be named as a defendant, anybody who provides support for an unlawful abortion can be sued in addition to the physician performing the procedure. That includes staff members at clinics, counselors, lawyers, financiers, and those who provide transportation to an abortion clinic, including drivers of a taxi or ride-hailing companies. The act incentivizes private enforcement by authorizing successful plaintiffs to collect "statutory damages" of "not less than $10,000" for each post-heartbeat abortion that the defendant performed or facilitated, in addition to court costs and attorney's fees if a defendant is proven liable. Plaintiffs are not required to have a personal connection to the patient or abortion provider in order to bring a lawsuit under SB 8.

Section 3 of the Act also insulates the state of Texas and its officials from being sued by preserving their sovereign immunity and forbidding them to enforce the statute in any way.

The Act allows defendants to escape liability if they demonstrate that the relief sought by the plaintiff will impose an “undue burden” on women seeking abortions. But the Act also provides that this “undue burden” defense is unavailable if the Supreme Court overrules Roe v. Wade or Planned Parenthood v. Casey, even if the abortion occurred while those decisions were in effect, and it establishes a four-year statute of limitations. This subjects abortion providers and their enablers to potential future liability for abortions performed in reliance on Roe and Casey if those decisions are later overruled, and it deterred the provision of abortions even while Roe and Casey remained on the books.

Finally, section 3 allows civil-enforcement lawsuits to be filed in the plaintiff's home county, raising the prospect that anyone who violates or assists a violation of SB 8 could be forced to defend themselves in any one of Texas's 254 counties, including deep-red counties where judges and juries will likely be hostile to abortion.

Section 4 

Section 4 of the Act requires litigants who challenge the constitutionality of any Texas abortion restriction to pay the attorneys' fees of "prevailing parties" if their challenge is unsuccessful. Section 4 also imposes joint and several liability on the attorneys and law firms that sue to enjoin the enforcement of any Texas abortion law.

At midnight, immediately after the law went into effect, many clinics in Texas including Planned Parenthood stopped performing abortion procedures and stopped taking new appointments. Many clinics reported an increase in patients at their clinics who had completed the 24-hour waiting period and sought to have the procedure done before the midnight deadline.

The act contains exceptions in the case of medical emergency, such as if the mother is at risk of death or severe irreversible bodily harm. It makes no exceptions for rape or incest. Because enforcement of the law relies upon civil reporting, there are provisions that state no "perpetrator of an act of rape, sexual assault, incest, or any other act prohibited by Sections 22.011, 22.021, or 25.02, Penal Code" may be involved in the reporting process. On September 7, 2021, Governor Abbott asserted that the Act does not force raped women to carry pregnancies to term because the state would "work tirelessly to make sure that we eliminate all rapists from the streets of Texas by aggressively going out and arresting them and prosecuting them and getting them off the streets".

Significance 
The act is the first time since Roe v. Wade that a state has successfully outlawed abortion as early as six weeks into a pregnancy, even for a brief period of time. In Texas, an estimated 85% of abortions had been performed after the six-week mark, which is often shortly after a pregnant woman misses her menstrual period, and before many women have confirmed or are aware of a pregnancy.

The federal-level Partial-Birth Abortion Ban Act from 2003 was enforced under both criminal and civil provisions. The civil enforcement mechanism allowed the father and grandparents of the fetus to sue for statutory damages. This provision had never been struck down by any courts, even when the criminal enforcement provision was blocked for a time by federal district courts. The Texas Heartbeat Act was unique in that it only contained a civil enforcement provision and not a criminal enforcement provision. This was designed to place the burden of enforcement on the populace through civil lawsuits rather than on state actors. This was engineered to deny abortion providers the opportunity to seek federal court injunctions against the enforcement of the statute by state officials. Since the law cannot be enforced by state officials but only by private individuals, there is uncertainty as to whom to sue in order to challenge the constitutionality of the act prior to enforcement.

In light of this feature in the law, U.S. Supreme Court Chief Justice John Roberts wrote that "the statutory scheme before the court is not only unusual, but unprecedented. The legislature has imposed a prohibition on abortions after roughly six weeks, and then essentially delegated enforcement of that prohibition to the populace at large. The desired consequence appears to be to insulate the state from responsibility for implementing and enforcing the regulatory regime."

A study produced by researchers at the University of Texas at Austin predicted that the bill would prohibit 80% of abortions in Texas and would disproportionately affect black women, lower-income women, and women who live far away from facilities that provide abortion services.

Academic opinions 
The Texas Heartbeat Act is intensely controversial because it was written to frustrate judicial review and thwart the judiciary from enforcing Supreme Court precedents that declared abortion to be a constitutionally protected right. That the Act succeeded in eliminating access to pre-viability abortions in Texas while Roe v. Wade ostensibly remained the law of the land has only added to the controversy surrounding the law. Law professors that supported Roe v. Wade, such as Laurence Tribe and Michael C. Dorf, have criticized the Act and its enforcement mechanism as "cynical" and "diabolical". Opponents of abortion have praised the Act's circumvention of Roe v. Wade as "brilliant", and "genius". Other commentators combine both views by describing the law as an act of "sinister brilliance”, "sinister genius", or "diabolical genius".

Questions have been raised concerning whether private citizens acting as plaintiffs have adequate legal standing to bring such lawsuits against doctors and other individuals who would aid an abortion. Legal standing is the "capacity of a party to bring suit in court" and has three requirements: injury-in-fact (a direct injury suffered by the plaintiff), causal connection (between the injury and the defendant's actions), and redressability (likelihood that a court decision can redress said injury). American courts have typically dismissed lawsuits that fail to prove a concrete harm to the plaintiff, like in Lujan v. Defenders of Wildlife where the plaintiffs, Defenders of Wildlife, brought suit against then Secretary of the Interior Manuel Lujan Jr. for inadequately safeguarding endangered species. The injury-in-fact argued was that all US citizens, including the plaintiffs, would be harmed if species were to go extinct. In that case, the Supreme Court ruled that such a diffuse harm did not constitute a concrete injury-in-fact which would allow the lawsuit to go forward. The expected injury-in-fact that SB8 plaintiffs might claim of experiencing "extreme outrage" that an abortion had occurred was seen as laughable and of dubious merit. However, the precedent set by Lujan v. Defenders of Wildlife might not apply specifically to SB8 cases held in Texas since state courts are not explicitly bound by precedents made by a federal court like the US Supreme Court. While Texas appeared to utilize a similar requirement for standing, the wording was sufficiently vague that one commentator felt they could not be counted on to guarantee dismissal.

Legal experts have noted that the act's enforcement model is not entirely new as it bears similarities to existing private attorney general laws. These laws grant special circumstances in which the plaintiff, a private citizen, can bring suit despite not suffering direct injury. Many of these involve qui tam suits where the plaintiff brings suit on behalf or in support of the government and is allowed to benefit if the suit succeeds. For example, several environmental pollution laws allow for individuals to bring suit against companies or individuals who have broken government environmental statutes; the False Claims Act allows for individuals to sue if there is evidence that the defendant has tried to defraud the government. However, this enforcement model, if utilized in similar ways to how SB8 implements it, could be used to limit other rights and freedoms that the people enjoy including like the right to bear arms, free speech, and gay marriage. For example, in an op-ed piece for The Hill in September 2021, Alan Dershowitz, emeritus professor of law at Harvard, suggested that liberal states could enact laws offering similar bounties for citizen lawsuits against anyone who facilitates the sale or ownership of handguns. Supreme Court justices Brett Kavanaugh and Elena Kagan expressed these concerns while hearing arguments in United States v. Texas. Some analysts have argued that as wrong as SB8's utilization of private citizen enforcement is, the enforcement model itself still holds merit. They draw a distinction between the ways in which the model is utilized and the intent. In qui tam cases, private individuals bring suit alongside and in support of government officials and these suits are still under government supervision while in SB8, the Texas government would be barred from participating in the suit. The other would be the intent of the law; up until Dobbs v. Jackson Women's Health Organization was decided, the right to abortion was considered to be protected by the Constitution. While environmental pollution lawsuits seek to aid the government in dealing with cases of the law being broken, SB8 was an unprecedented instance of private individuals being granted the right to deprive another individual of a (then) federally protected right. This led one commentator to note that "Rather than a “private attorney general” statute, it is a private vigilante law".

Academic opinion is divided on whether the Act can be subject to pre-enforcement judicial review given that no state officials are charged with enforcing the law and are, in fact, prohibited from enforcing it. In an op-ed published in The New York Times, law professors Laurence Tribe and Steve Vladeck acknowledged that the Act's enforcement mechanism "makes it very difficult, procedurally, to challenge the bill's constitutionality in court", but argued that abortion providers "should" still be able to challenge the law's constitutionality by suing state-court judges and court clerks. The Supreme Court rejected this idea in Whole Woman's Health v. Jackson, holding that abortion providers could not sue state-court judges or court clerks under the doctrine of sovereign immunity. Other legal scholars, such as Harvard's Stephen Sachs, Yale's Akhil Reed Amar, and Edward Whelan of the Ethics and Public Policy Center, have argued that SB8's unique design precludes abortion providers from challenging the constitutionality of the statute in pre-enforcement litigation.

Tribe has suggested ways for the United States Department of Justice (DOJ) to combat the effects of the Texas Heartbeat Act. In an op-ed published by The Washington Post on September 5, 2021, Tribe urged DOJ to prosecute any individual who sues an abortion provider under sections 241 or 242 of the federal criminal code, which make it a crime to deprive individuals of any constitutional rights. Tribe and Risenberg also suggested using a "civil parallel of the Ku Klux Klan Act" of 1871 to deter individuals from suing abortion providers who violate the Texas Heartbeat Act, and recommended that the U.S. Attorney General launch criminal prosecutions and sue private parties under the Act on the grounds of deprivation of rights under color of law. The two also cited the precedent of Larkin v. Grendel's Den, Inc., as an argument against the constitutionality of delegating certain government decisions to private parties. At the time of writing, the DOJ had not yet acted on any of Tribe's suggestions.

The private remedies authorized by SB 8 can only be awarded by a state court in a lawsuit brought under SB 8, which is why Whole Women's Health and a group of abortion providers sued a Texas judge under Section 1983 of the Civil Rights Act to enjoin him and a defendant class of all other Texas trial-level judges from entertaining SB 8 lawsuits. On September 10, 2021, a motions panel of the Fifth Circuit Court of Appeals rejected the idea that state judges and their court clerks could be sued in federal court to prevent them from hearing SB 8 cases, characterizing the approach as absurd.

Legal challenges

Pre-enforcement litigation by providers and advocates 
A Dallas attorney filed a lawsuit and accompanying request for a restraining order in Dallas Texas District Court attempting to block the bill, arguing that the language of the law prevents attorneys from consulting with clients about abortion, even in cases of rape and incest, and is thus a violation of attorney-client privilege and victims rights of the sexually abused. This action was nonsuited and refiled in Travis County (Austin, Texas), where it remains pending, along with numerous companion cases by abortion providers and funders, who are all represented by the same attorneys.

On September 3, 2021, a Travis County judge granted three Texas Planned Parenthood affiliates a temporary restraining order against Texas Right to Life, with a temporary injunction hearing set for September 13. The ruling temporarily blocks the anti-abortion group and affiliated individuals from suing them under the Act. Another trial court judge later signed an agreed temporary injunction order in the same case.

On December 9, 2021, a retired judge, sitting by appointment of the Texas Judicial Panel on Multi-District Litigation, ruled that portions of the statute's civil enforcement mechanism violate the Texas Constitution, but did not grant a permanent injunction enjoining the law's enforcement. As of 2022, the case is on interlocutory appeal in the Third Court of Appeals in Austin, Texas, and the law remains in effect.

Whole Woman's Health v. Jackson 

Before the new law went into effect, a group of abortion providers led by Whole Woman's Health (WWH) sued to get a preliminary injunction to stay enforcement of the law on September 1, 2021. Their suit included a state district court judge and his court clerk as representative defendants for all state judges and clerks that have jurisdiction to hear suits brought under the Heartbeat Act, in addition to other state officials include attorney general Ken Paxton, and a private individual that had publicly stated their intent to file suit against an abortion provider once SB 8 came into effect. The abortion clinics challenged the sovereign immunity portion of the law, stating that because the judges and clerks are involved with enforcement of SB 8, they can be defendants to legal challenges due to the Ex parte Young doctrine. In late August 2021, district judge Robert L. Pitman rejected a motion to dismiss the case and scheduled a hearing on the temporary injunction requested by the plaintiffs. An expedited appeal to the U.S. Court of Appeals for the Fifth Circuit led that court to stay the district court's proceedings, on the basis that the state official defendants were likely immune from being sued while the case against the private individual remained in consideration. The plaintiffs filed an emergency application with the Supreme Court on August 30, 2021, seeking an order to block the Act from going into effect. Late on September 1, 2021, nearly 24 hours after the Act had come into force, the Supreme Court denied the motion in an unsigned order, though four Justices wrote or joined dissents that stated they would have granted the injunction pending legal evaluation. The majority opinion on the motion stressed that the denial of immediate relief did not preclude other legal challenges in lower federal or Texas state courts.

The Fifth Circuit issued a second order on September 10, 2021, ruling that the state judges, clerks, and other officials were not proper defendants, while the case against the private individual remained and was to be evaluated by the Circuit court at a later date. Again, the plaintiffs filed a petition for a pre-judgment writ of certiorari at the Supreme Court based on the Fifth Circuit's order, again seeking an injunction on the enforcement of SB 8. The Supreme Court, in its related actions to United States v. Texas, denied the plaintiff's motions in WWH v. Jackson, but certified the petition for the case, and scheduled its oral arguments alongside United States v. Texas for November 1, 2021.

The Supreme Court issued its decision on December 10, 2021, and dismissed the claims that Texas abortion providers had brought against a state-court judge, a court clerk, the state's attorney general, and a private citizen. The Court allowed the abortion providers' claims against state licensing officials to proceed beyond the motion-to-dismiss stage, and remanded the case back to the Fifth Circuit. On remand, the Fifth Circuit asked the Supreme Court of Texas to resolve whether SB 8 allowed state licensing officials to enforce the law, and certified the case proceed to the state supreme court. In March, 2022, the Supreme Court of Texas unanimously ruled that SB 8 explicitly forbids state licensing officials to enforce the law, ending the abortion providers' federal pre-enforcement challenge to SB 8. The state supreme court's ruling, along with the U.S. Supreme Court's ruling in Whole Woman's Health v. Jackson, leaves abortion providers without any possible defendants to sue in a federal pre-enforcement lawsuit challenging the constitutionality of SB 8, because there are no state officials charged with enforcing the law.

United States v. Texas 

United States Attorney General Merrick Garland announced on September 6, 2021, that the Justice Department (DOJ) will protect abortion seekers in Texas under the Freedom of Access to Clinic Entrances Act. The DOJ filed their suit against the state on September 9, 2021 in the District Court for the Western District of Texas, with the suit claiming "the law is invalid under the Supremacy Clause and the Fourteenth Amendment, is preempted by federal law, and violates the doctrine of intergovernmental immunity". The DOJ asked for an emergency motion for a temporary restraining order or a preliminary injunction of SB8 on September 15, 2021. In its defense, Texas challenged the standing of the federal government to seek remedies against private individuals and sought dismissal of their case.

District judge Robert L. Pitman, who was also overseeing the WWH v. Jackson case, issued a preliminary injunction blocking enforcing of the Act on October 6, 2021, ruling that the United States government does have standing to challenge Texas' law. Texas appealed to the Fifth Circuit Court of Appeals on October 8, 2021, and in a per curiam decision that day, the Fifth Circuit put a hold on Pitman's order, "pending the court's consideration of the emergency motion". On October 14, 2021, the motions panel granted the State's and the three aligned Intervenors' motions for emergency stay in a brief order that merely referenced the decision rationales articulated by the SCOTUS and the Fifth Circuit in the pending WWH v. Jackson case. They also ordered that the appeal on the merits be jointly taken up on an accelerated basis by the same panel of the Fifth Circuit that will hear oral argument in the WWH v. Jackson appeal.

The DOJ filed an application for emergency relief from the Supreme Court on October 18, 2021. On October 22, 2021, the SCOTUS declined to grant the DOJ's emergency request to lift the Fifth Circuit's stay, but did grant the petition for certiorari before judgment and set expedited oral arguments for November 1, 2021. In certifying the case, the Supreme Court limited the case to review the question of the standing raised by the state. The oral arguments for United States v. Texas will be heard alongside those for WWH v. Jackson. Justice Sotomayor concurred in the decision to hear the case on an expedited basis, but dissented on the denial of an immediate stay order in the interim.

The Supreme Court ruled in a per curiam decision on December 10, 2021, to dismiss the writ of certiorari as improvidently granted.

Other pending Supreme Court petitions

SCOTUS cases relating to United States v. Texas 
No. 21-588,  United States, Petitioner v. Texas, et al., docketed October 14, 2021 in conjunction with consideration of application (21A85) to vacate Fifth Circuit stay presented to Justice Alito and by him referred to the Court is deferred pending oral argument on November 1, 2021.

No. 21A85, United States, Petitioner v. Texas, et al., Application to vacate stay of preliminary injunction issued by U.S. Court of Appeals for the Fifth Circuit by the United States. Submitted to Justice Alito and referred to the Court. Consideration deferred pending oral argument on November 1, 2021.

SCOTUS cases relating to Whole Woman's Health v. Jackson 
 No. 21-587, Penny Clarkston, Petitioner v. Whole Woman's Health, et al., docketed October 21, 2021. Petition for a writ of certiorari before judgment filed. Response due November 22, 2021. Ms. Clarkston is the District Clerk serving the 114th District Court and other district courts in Smith County, Texas. The presiding judge of the 114th District Court is the primary official-capacity defendant in Whole Women's Health v. Jackson.
 No. 21-583, Stephen Brint Carlton, et al., Petitioners v. Whole Woman's Health, et al., docketed October 21, 2021. Petition for a writ of certiorari before judgment filed. Response due November 22, 2021.
 No. 21-582, Mark Lee Dickson, Petitioner v. Whole Woman's Health, et al., docketed October 21, 2021. Petition for a writ of certiorari before judgment filed. Response due November 22, 2021. Mr. Dickson is a private individual and anti-abortion activist, and was named as a defendant because abortion providers anticipated that he would bring SB8 actions against them.
 No. 21-463, Whole Woman's Health, et al., Petitioners v. Austin Reeve Jackson, Judge, District Court of Texas, 114th District, et al. Petition for a writ of certiorari before judgment filed on September 23, 2021, GRANTED on October 22, 2021. Oral argument set for Monday, November 1, 2021. Judge Jackson is on record as being anti-abortion and was named as a proposed class representative for all Texas judges who might hear SB8 cases.
 No. 21A24, Whole Woman's Health, et al., Applicants, v. Austin Reeve Jackson, Judge, et al., docketed August 30, 2021. Application for emergency injunction denied by the court per curiam, with separate opinions issued by Chief Justice Roberts, with whom Justice Breyer and Justice KAGAN join, dissenting; Justice Breyer, with whom Justice Sotomayor and Justice Kagan join, dissenting; Justice Sotomayor, with whom Justice BREYER and Justice KAGAN join, dissenting; and Justice Kagan, with whom Justice Breyer and Justice Sotomayor join, dissenting.

First lawsuits based on SB8

Against abortion provider 
On September 18, 2021, in an op-ed published by The Washington Post, San Antonio physician Alan Braid admitted that he had performed an abortion that was illegal under the Act on September 6. He stated that he performed the abortion "because I had a duty of care to this patient, as I do for all patients, and because she has a fundamental right to receive this care." He acknowledged that he would be opening himself up to liability from civil lawsuits related to the Act.

On September 20, 2021, Oscar Stilley, a former lawyer in Arkansas, filed a lawsuit against Braid for providing the abortion. Stilley told reporters that he did it in an effort to speed up the process of getting the law reviewed. Another lawsuit by Felipe Gomez of Chicago was filed against Braid the same day. Gomez argues for the law to be declared unconstitutional as the law is illegal until Roe v. Wade is reversed or modified. Both lawsuits were commenced in San Antonio in the defendant's county. One is in forma pauperis. Both plaintiffs are not averse to publicity. Both have also intervened in the federal case brought by the DOJ against Texas. Legal experts expect SB 8 lawsuits brought by pro-abortion rights plaintiffs to fail for lack of a controversy and thus standing.

Against private citizens 
In 2023, the first lawsuit based on SB8 was filed against three women who were friends of a woman who obtained an abortion. The plaintiff is the woman's ex-husband. The women are accused of sending links to aidaccess.org, an abortion provider which mails abortion pills across state lines, which has been legal in the United States since 2021.

State-court challenges to SB8 by abortion providers and funders 
Texas abortion providers, funders, and other pro-abortion plaintiffs filed a total of 14 other lawsuits, some before the Act's September 1, 2021, effectiveness date, against Texas Right to Life and the organization's officers, employees, and collaborators, challenging S.B.8 as unconstitutional under various provisions of the state constitution. The plaintiffs relied on the Texas Declaratory Judgments Act and sought declaratory and injunctive relief. The separate actions were subsequently consolidated for pretrial proceedings by the Texas Judicial Panel on Multi-District Litiation (MDL Panel) and remain pending in a Travis County district court. The MDL Panel assigned the Hon. David Peeples, a senior-status judge, to preside over the 14 cases.

With one exception, the 14 suits against Texas Right to Life originally also named state officials as defendants, including Governor Abbott and numerous GOP legislators, but these state officials were later nonsuited.

On  December 9, 2021, Judge Peeples granted some of the declaratory relief requested by the plaintiffs but did not grant a permanent injunction, leaving that issue for a trial on the merits. Texas Right to Life and its legislative director immediately appealed the denial of their motion to dismiss, which resulted in a stay of further proceedings in the trial court pending resolution of the interlocutory appeal. The case style for the MDL cases is Van Stean v. Texas Right to Life, No. 03-21-00650-CV in the Third Court of Appeals and Cause No. D-1-GN-21-004179 in Travis County district court.

Aftermath 

The anti-abortion organization Texas Right to Life established a "whistleblower reporting system" that enabled residents to anonymously report suspected violators of the bill. Their website came under denial-of-service and satirical attacks featuring copypastas and eroticized fan-art of Shrek based on the prevalent internet meme, as well as profuse non-pertinent and misleading information. On September 3, 2021, webhost GoDaddy gave the website 24 hours to find a new host before terminating their service for multiple terms-of-service violations. On September 4, the website changed its domain registration to Epik, a registrar and web hosting company known for providing services to websites which have been denied service for content policy violations by other providers. The site went offline later that day, after Epik told the group they had violated their terms of service by collecting private information about third parties; the website subsequently began redirecting users to the Texas Right to Life organization's website.

A non-profit organization that supports abortion-rights announced that after the law went into effect their website traffic had increased with a large number of traffic coming from Texas. Through the site, visitors can view information about abortion pills and care providers.

On September 4, 2021, The Satanic Temple, a self-described nontheistic religious and human rights group, filed a letter of complaint to the US Food and Drug Administration arguing that the law violated the constitutional rights of members to free religious practice, referring specifically to the Religious Freedom Restoration Act.

Reactions 

Ride-sharing services Lyft and Uber announced that they would cover 100% of the legal defense costs for any of their drivers sued under this new law, while dating app companies Bumble and Match Group, owner of Tinder, announced they would establish a relief fund to assist Texas women seeking abortions.

John Gibson, the CEO of the video game developer/publisher Tripwire Interactive, tweeted in support of the bill and the Supreme Court's decision to not block its enforcement on September 4, 2021. Over the next few days, video game journalists, other developers, and members of the players' community expressed outrage at the tweet, leading to Gibson stepping down as CEO on September 6, 2021, and Tripwire distancing itself from Gibson's statement.

Protests 
On the day the act went into effect, protesters rallied in the Texas state capital of Austin, Texas. Women in Dallas protested while wearing costumes from The Handmaid's Tale, a dystopian novel about women living in a totalitarian theocracy. Other small demonstrations were organized near city halls of other Texas towns. The day after the bill was enacted, the hashtag #texastaliban, a critical reference to the Taliban, trended on Twitter with over 50,000 tweets.

On September 3, hacktivist group Anonymous announced "Operation Jane", an initiative to oppose the law. The group subsequently hacked the website of the Republican Party of Texas, replacing it with text about Anonymous, an invitation to join Operation Jane, and a Planned Parenthood donation link. On September 13, the group released a large quantity of private data belonging to Epik, including domain purchase and transfer details, account credentials and logins, payment history, employee emails, and unidentified private keys. The Distributed Denial of Secrets (DDoSecrets) organization said later that day that they were working to curate the allegedly leaked data for public download, and said that it consisted of "180 gigabytes of user, registration, forwarding and other information". Publications including The Daily Dot and The Record by Recorded Future subsequently confirmed the veracity of the hack and the types of data that had been exposed.

Protests occurred in about 600 places nationwide on October 2. They were called the 2021 Women's March.

Public opinion on the law is divided, with two polls showing a narrow majority support the new legislation. One poll showed that roughly 55% of Texans support the law, compared to 45% who oppose it. Another poll showed a plurality of 46% of Texans supporting the law, while 43% remain opposed.

Political reactions

President Joe Biden criticized the act, describing it as "extreme" and saying it "blatantly violates the constitutional right established under Roe v. Wade". Senator Elizabeth Warren argued that it is time to "step up and codify Roe into federal law". Congressional candidate for the 28th district of Texas, Jessica Cisneros, also spoke out against the act, stating that the law puts women at risk and it has a disproportionate impact on women of color and low income women. She stated: "When laws that push access to reproductive health care out of reach take effect, it's always women of color and low-income communities that are most harmed. Others who have the resources and connections will always find a way to receive the care they need."

Some Republicans, such as South Dakota governor Kristi Noem praised the act, while others (including 2021 Virginia gubernatorial candidate Glenn Youngkin and Senate minority leader Mitch McConnell) were more leery. Some other states, including Florida and Ohio, have introduced legislation with language that mimics the Texas law.

On December 11, 2021, a day after the Supreme Court effectively upheld enforcement of the law in Whole Woman's Health v. Jackson, Governor Gavin Newsom of California called for the state legislature to apply the legal framework from Texas' law to gun control, seeking a bill that would introduce a private right of action against manufacturers, distributors, and sellers of assault weapon or ghost gun supplies in the state.

At the end of April 2022, the Connecticut General Assembly passed House Bill 5414, the Reproductive Freedom Defense Act, which allows anyone sued under the Texas law, or others like it, for performing or facilitating an abortion which took place at least in part in Connecticut to countersue in that state for the equivalent amount of damages, plus attorney's fees. It also prohibits the governor of Connecticut from extraditing any Connecticut resident to another state for performing an abortion legal in Connecticut, bars courts in the state from issuing subpoenas or any orders related to such enforcement in another state, and prohibits any state or law enforcement agency in Connecticut from cooperating with such investigations.

In July 2022, California governor, Gavin Newsom signed Senate Bill 1327, which is modeled after the Texas law, but allows private citizens to sue a licensed firearms dealer who "sells, supplies, delivers, or gives possession or control of a firearm" to anyone under 21 years old. It allows citizens to sue for a minimum of $10,000 on each weapon involved, as well as attorney fees.

See also

 Abortion in Texas
 Abortion in the United States
 City of Akron v. Akron Center for Reproductive Health
 Dobbs v. Jackson Women's Health Organization
 Faith2Action
 Six-week abortion ban
 Heart development
 Whole Woman's Health v. Hellerstedt

References

External links 

 U.S. v. Texas, no. 21-796 (W.D. Tex. Sep. 9, 2021); complaint filed by U.S. Justice Department to invalidate the Act.
 Docket and documents for United States v. State of Texas, No. 1:21-cv-796 (W.D. Tex. Sept. 9, 2021) and Fifth Circuit Court of Appeals Docket #: 21-50949

2021 in Texas
2021 in American law
Texas statutes
United States state abortion legislation
Abortion in the United States
Heartbeat bills
Anti-abortion movement
Texas anti-abortion legislation